The Leopard in Autumn was a BBC comedy-drama radio series by Neil Anthony set in the fictional principality of  Monte Guano in Renaissance Italy. Its title was a reference to the 1966 play by James Goldman The Lion in Winter. It was run for 12 episodes between April 2001 and June 2002 on BBC Radio 4 and repeated on BBC Radio 4 Extra in 2011 and 2012.

Synopsis

The Leopard in Autumn follows the lives of the ruling family and court of Monte Guano, a small and impoverished Italian principality. Prince Ludovico II ("the Magnificent") is the impious ruler of Monte Guano, but repeatedly finds his political ambitions thwarted, both by the financial demands imposed by the Pope on Monte Guano and by his family. Princess Plethora is a much more intelligent and thoughtful character who is behind many successful ploys to improve Monte Guano's financial clout. She is good friends with Countess Rosalie, Ludovico's "official mistress" who arrived in Monte Guano with the intention of marrying the eldest son of the Prince. Salvatore, the eldest son, wants to go into the church (to become pope) and thus could not marry. Unfortunately for him, his career cannot start because his family do not have enough money to pay to have him ordained priest. His (excessive) private devotion to Catholicism brings him into friction with the youngest brother Guido, a Protestant, and devotee of Martin Luther's works. The middle brother, Allesandro, to the disappointment of his father wishes to be an artist and inventor, and thus requires financial support (and a degree of tolerance) from his father.

Other characters include Francesco, frustrated poet, chronicler and secretary to Ludivico. His constant inebriation and frustrated poetic ambitions are the subject of several jokes.

Throughout the series, Ludivico's speech is characterised by his use of the word "Sneck" as a form of swearing.

Both series are set in the period from 1520 to 1523.

Cast
The Leopard in Autumn starred David Swift as Prince Ludovico, ruler of Monte Guano; Siân Phillips as his wife Princess Plethora; Graham Crowden as Francesco (Ludovico's secretary); Saskia Wickham as Countess Rosalie (Ludovico's mistress) and as Ludovico's perpetually squabbling sons: Nick Romero as the religious Salvatore, Paul Bigley as Allesandro (artist and inventor) and Christopher Kelham as Guido (a staunch Lutheran).

Episodes

Series 1

Series 2

See also
The Castle, another historical BBC radio comedy.

References

External links

The Leopard in Autumn, epguides.com

BBC Radio comedy programmes
Renaissance in popular culture
2001 radio programme debuts
2002 radio programme endings